Helio da Rocha Camargo (born 1 February 1926) was the first Brazilian general authority of the Church of Jesus Christ of Latter-day Saints (LDS Church). He was called to the First Quorum of the Seventy in 1985 and served there for four years.  In 1989, he was transferred, along with other limited-term members of the First Quorum of the Seventy to the newly created Second Quorum of the Seventy. Camargo was released as a general authority in 1990.

Camargo was born in Rio de Janeiro. He entered a military academy in 1943 and he advanced to the rank of captain in the Brazilian military before his retirement.

Camargo married Nair Belmira de Bouvea and they had six children. Nair served as temple matron of the São Paulo Brazil Temple when her husband was the temple's president.  She was also as an area representative for the church's auxiliary boards.

After leaving the military, Camargo moved to São Paulo where he became a banker and also entered a Methodist seminary. Camargo was ordained a Methodist minister but was later expelled from the seminary because he opposed infant baptism. He was one of three ministers expelled at that point, the other two were Saul Messias de Oliveira and Walter Guedes de Queiroz, who also later joined the LDS Church.

Camargo read literature he had previously received from LDS Church missionaries and then started attending meetings of the church. His conversion was helped by hearing the testimony of a young lady on the power of the law of chastity. He was baptized in 1957.

Camargo served as the first president of the São Paulo East Stake when it was organized in November 1968.

Camargo also served as a bishop, counselor to a mission president, and as president of the Rio de Janeiro mission, which then covered all of Brazil north and north west of Rio de Janeiro. Among the missionaries who served under Camargo when he was mission president was Ulisses Soares, who would later become an apostle in the LDS Church.

Camargo's wife died in April 2020.

Camargo's son, Milton R. Camargo, was called as 1st counselor in the LDS Church's Sunday School General Presidency in 2019.

Notes

References
"The Church in Brazil," Ensign, February 1975, p. 24
McClellan, Richard D. "Helio R. Camargo" in Garr et al., Encyclopedia of Latter-day Saint History, p. 172
"Elder Helio R. Camargo of the First Quorum of the Seventy," Ensign, May 1985, p. 93

External links
Grampa Bill's G.A. Pages: Helio R. Camargo

1926 births
Brazilian general authorities (LDS Church)
Brazilian Mormon missionaries
Converts to Mormonism from Methodism
Living people
Members of the First Quorum of the Seventy (LDS Church)
Members of the Second Quorum of the Seventy (LDS Church)
Mission presidents (LDS Church)
People from Rio de Janeiro (city)
Temple presidents and matrons (LDS Church)